Harenkarspel is a former municipality in the Netherlands, in the province of North Holland and the region of West-Frisia. The main town of Harenkarspel was Tuitjenhorn. In 2013, Harenkarspel merged with Schagen and Zijpe into a new municipality, which is called Schagen.

Population centres 
The former municipality of Harenkarspel consisted of the following villages: Dirkshorn, Eenigenburg, Groenveld, Kalverdijk, Kerkbuurt, Krabbendam, 't Rijpje, Schoorldam (partly), Sint Maarten, Stroet, Tuitjenhorn, Valkkoog, Waarland, and Warmenhuizen. The largest towns were Warmenhuizen and Tuitjenhorn. The town hall of Harenkarspel was located in Tuitjenhorn.

Local government 
The municipal council of Harenkarspel consisted of 17 seats, which were divided as follows:

 CDA - 6 seats
 PvdA - 4 seats
 Algemeen Belang '89 - 4 seats
 VVD - 3 seats

References 
 Statistics are taken from the SDU Staatscourant

External links

A map of the former municipality of Harenkarspel 
City Site (Dutch)
Nieuws over Harenkarspel (Dutch)
Alles over Schagen FM, de lokale omroep voor Schagen, Zijpe, Niedorp en Harenkarspel (Dutch)

Schagen
Former municipalities of North Holland
Municipalities of the Netherlands disestablished in 2013